Tetsumasa Yamaguchi (born March 5, 1947) is a Japanese sprint canoer who competed in the late 1960s and early 1970s. Competing in two Summer Olympics, he was eliminated in the semifinals in each of three events he competed (1968: C-1 1000 m, C-2 1000 m; 1972: C-1 1000 m).

External links
Sports-reference.com profile

1947 births
Canoeists at the 1968 Summer Olympics
Canoeists at the 1972 Summer Olympics
Japanese male canoeists
Living people
Olympic canoeists of Japan